Paweł Szczepan Sobek (23 December 1929 – 14 September 2015) was a Polish footballer.

Playing career

Club career
Sobek played for Szombierki Bytom and Górnik Radlin in the Ekstraklasa.

In 1965 he moved to Australia to play for Cracovia in Perth, Western Australia. After retiring he was inducted into the West Australian Football Hall of Fame.

International career
Sobek represented Poland five times in full internationals, including one match at the 1952 Olympic Football tournament.

References

Polish footballers
Poland international footballers
Olympic footballers of Poland
Footballers at the 1952 Summer Olympics
Polish emigrants to Australia
Sportspeople from Bytom
Ekstraklasa players
1929 births
2015 deaths
People from the Province of Upper Silesia
Szombierki Bytom players
Association football forwards